The America Movil Submarine Cable System-1 (AMX-1) is a fiber optic submarine communications cable of 17,800 kilometers that extends between the United States, Mexico, Guatemala, Colombia, Dominican Republic, Puerto Rico, Costa Rica and Brazil.

Information 

The submarine cable means an investment of 500 million of dollars. It connects six countries (Mexico, Guatemala, Colombia, Dominican Republic, Brazil, Costa Rica) and one territory (Puerto Rico) with The United States. The cable has a length of 17,500 kilometers, and ends in Miami, Florida.

Landing points 

 Barranquilla, Colombia
 Cancún, Mexico
 Cartagena, Colombia
 Fortaleza, Brazil
 Jacksonville, Florida, United States
 Miami, Florida, United States
 Puerto Barrios, Guatemala
 Puerto Plata, Dominican Republic
 Rio de Janeiro, Brazil
 Salvador, Brazil
 San Juan, Puerto Rico, United States
 Limón, Costa Rica

References

External links
 Submarine Cable Map

Submarine communications cables in the Caribbean Sea
2014 establishments in North America
2014 establishments in Brazil